Bojszowy Nowe  is a village, in the administrative district of Gmina Bojszowy, within Bieruń-Lędziny County, Silesian Voivodeship, in southern Poland.

The village has a population of 1,192.

References

Bojszowy Nowe